3,4-Dihydroxystyrene (DHS) is a centrally-acting inhibitor of the enzyme phenylalanine hydroxylase (PH). It is likely that DHS and other PH inhibitors will never have clinical applications on account of their capacity for inducing hyperphenylalaninemia and phenylketonuria.

See also 
Phenylalanine hydroxylase

References 

Catechols
Vinyl compounds